Tulkalam is a 2007 Indian Bengali-language film. Directed by Haranath Chakraborty and produced by Pijush Saha. It stars Mithun Chakraborty, Rachana Banerjee, Paoli Dam, and Rajatava Dutta.

Plot
Tulkalam is a political action film based on land scams in West Bengal.

Cast
 Mithun Chakraborty as CBI officer Tanmay Sanyal aka Toofan
 Rachana Banerjee as Gauri
 Hara Patnaik as Avinash Mukherjee, MLA of Haridebpur
 Ashok Bhattacharya as Parimal Ghosh, farmer's leader and Panchayat party head
 Rajatava Dutta as Haripada Samanta, Avinash's brother-in-law
 Amitabh Bhattacharjee as Chhoton Shikdar
 Biplab Chatterjee as Central Minister
 Arun Bannerjee as Municipality Chairman Satyabrata Chappel
 Mrinal Mukherjee as Salim Rahman
 Anamika Saha as Banolata Shikdar
 Rajesh Sharma as Pratap Mondal, Officer in Charge of Haridebpur Police Station
 Paoli Dam as Priya Chappel
 Ramen Roy Chowdhury as DIG
 Nimu Bhowmick as Head of U.B. group came for industrialization

References

External links
 

2007 films
2000s Bengali-language films
Bengali-language Indian films
Indian political films
Indian action films
2000s masala films
2007 action films
2000s political films
Films directed by Haranath Chakraborty